Patric Göran Kjellberg (born June 17, 1969) is a Swedish former professional ice hockey left wing. He was drafted in the fourth round, 83rd overall, by the Montreal Canadiens in the 1988 NHL Entry Draft.

Career
Drafted from the Swedish Elite League's AIK, Kjellberg made his North American professional debut during the 1992–93 season with Montreal's AHL affiliate, the Fredericton Canadiens. He also made his NHL debut that same season with Montreal, appearing in seven games. After the season, however, Kjellberg returned to Sweden and played five more seasons in Elitserien. With HV71, he won the Swedish National Championship during the season of 1994–1995.

Kjellberg returned to the NHL in the 1998–99 season to play with the Nashville Predators. He was traded during the 2001–02 season to the Mighty Ducks of Anaheim in exchange for Petr Tenkrat.

In his NHL career, Kjellberg appeared in 394 games. He scored 64 goals and added 96 assists. He also appeared in ten Stanley Cup playoff games with Anaheim during the 2003 playoffs, going scoreless.

After his playing career, Kjellberg has worked for Leksands IF as sports manager.

Career statistics

Regular season and playoffs

International

References

External links

1969 births
AIK IF players
Djurgårdens IF Hockey players
Falu IF players
Fredericton Canadiens players
HV71 players
Ice hockey players at the 1992 Winter Olympics
Ice hockey players at the 1994 Winter Olympics
Ice hockey players at the 1998 Winter Olympics
Living people
Medalists at the 1994 Winter Olympics
Mighty Ducks of Anaheim players
Montreal Canadiens draft picks
Montreal Canadiens players
Nashville Predators players
New York Rangers scouts
Olympic gold medalists for Sweden
Olympic ice hockey players of Sweden
Olympic medalists in ice hockey
People from Trelleborg
Swedish expatriate ice hockey players in Canada
Swedish expatriate ice hockey players in the United States
Swedish ice hockey left wingers
Sportspeople from Skåne County